is located in Setagaya, Tokyo, Japan, on the north-east bank of the Tama River. The area surrounding the station is commonly called Futako-Tamagawa, and often refers to the Tamagawa and Seta districts of Setagaya, but there is no precise definition. It is colloquially referred to as "Futako" (フタコ) or "Nikotama" (ニコタマ), from an alternate reading of the first three kanji characters in the name.

Lines
 Tōkyū Corporation
Tōkyū Den-en-toshi Line (DT-07)
Tōkyū Ōimachi Line (OM-15)

Station layout

Surrounding area

The east side of Futako-Tamagawa station is mostly occupied by the Futako-Tamagawa Rise complex. The  shopping center, located on the west side, is a branch of the Takashimaya department store chain. It opened as Japan's first suburban shopping centre in 1969, and kick-started the development of similar stores around Japan. St. Mary's International School students use this station as a primary way to get to school.  Rakuten also has its corporate headquarters adjacent to this station.
 Komazawa University   (Futakotamagawa campus)

History

March 1, 1924  (Tram) started.
July 15, 1927  started from Tamagawa Station to Mizonokuchi Station.
November 1, 1929  started. And   opened.
December 25, 1929 Futako-Tamagawa Line was integrated into Oimachi Line.
December 1, 1940 Yomiuri-Yuen Station and Futako-Tamagawa Station were integrated, and the name became .
July 1, 1943 Mizonokuchi Line was integrated into Oimachi Line.
October 20, 1944 Futako-Yomiurien Station was renamed to Futako-Tamagawa Station.
October 11, 1963 Oimachi Line was renamed to Den-en-toshi Line.
May 10, 1969 Tamagawa Line and Kinuta Line were abolished.
April 7, 1977  started.
August 12, 1979 The name of Oimachi Line was revived.
August 6, 2000 Shin-Tamagawa Line was renamed to Den-en-toshi Line. And, Futako-Tamagawaen Station was renamed to Futako-Tamagawa Station.

Further reading
  - Published online on January 3, 2017

External links

Futako-Tamagawa Station 

Railway stations in Japan opened in 1907
Railway stations in Tokyo
Stations of Tokyu Corporation
Tokyu Den-en-toshi Line
Tokyu Oimachi Line
Setagaya